Mount Owen is the second highest peak in the Teton Range, Grand Teton National Park in the U.S. state of Wyoming. The peak is named after William O. Owen, who organized the first documented ascent of the Grand Teton in 1898. Mount Owen is part of the Cathedral Group of high Teton peaks, a collection of peaks in the central section of the range that are particularly rugged. Several periods of glaciation have carved Mount Owen and the other peaks of the range into their current shapes. Valhalla Canyon is situated on the west slopes of Mount Owen.

Climbing
After two failed attempts in 1927 and one in 1928, Mount Owen was first climbed in 1930, and was one of the last of the major Teton peaks to be climbed. Numerous routes have been explored, ranging in difficulty from Class 5.1 to 5.10

See also
 Geology of the Grand Teton area

References

Owen
Owen
Owen